Ahmed Al-Fahmi  (born 12 December 1990) is a Saudi Arabian footballer who plays for Al-Nairyah as a goalkeeper.

Club career statistics

References

1990 births
Living people
Sportspeople from Mecca
Saudi Arabian footballers
Al-Wehda Club (Mecca) players
Al-Qaisumah FC players
Al-Qadsiah FC players
Al-Washm Club players
Al-Kawkab FC players
Al-Arabi SC (Saudi Arabia) players
Al-Nairyah Club players
Saudi First Division League players
Saudi Professional League players
Saudi Second Division players
Association football goalkeepers